Tala Allam is a village in the Tizi Ouzou Province in Kabylie, Algeria.

Location
The village is surrounded by Sebaou River and the town of Tizi Ouzou in the Djurdjura mountain range.

Notable people 
 Mohamed Belhocine (born 1951), Algerian medical scientist, professor of internal medicine and epidemiology.

Gallery

References

Villages in Algeria
Tizi Ouzou Province
Kabylie